Ahmedbhai Muhammedbhai Patel (21 August 194925 November 2020), also known as Ahmed Patel, was an Indian politician and Member of Parliament from the Indian National Congress. He was the political secretary to Congress President Sonia Gandhi.

Patel has represented Gujarat for eight terms in the Parliament of India; three times in the lower house or Lok Sabha (19771989) and five times in the upper House or Rajya Sabha (19932020). He was also the treasurer of the All India Congress Committee (20182020).

Early life 
Patel was born on 21 August 1949, in the small village piraman, Ta-Ankleshwar, dist-Bharuch-based agriculturalist family, as the third child of Mohammed Ishaakji Patel and Hawaben Mohammedbhai in the western Indian state of Gujarat. His father was a social worker. He went on to join the Youth Congress, the youth wing of the Indian National Congress.

Political career

Patel started his political career by contesting local body elections in the Bharuch District of Gujarat in 1976.

He was selected by the then Indian Prime Minister, Indira Gandhi, in 1977 to contest elections for the Sixth Lok Sabha from Bharuch. He went on to win the elections, and also won subsequent Lok Sabha elections in 1980 and 1984, continuing to represent Bharuch in the Parliament through 1989. In 1985, he went on to become the Parliamentary Secretary to then Prime Minister Rajiv Gandhi. In 1987, in his capacity as Member of Parliament, he had helped set up the Narmada Management Authority to monitor the Sardar Sarovar Project. He was appointed the secretary of the Jawahar Bhavan Trust in 1988 and is credited with having completed the construction of the Jawahar Bhavan in time for Nehru's birth centenary celebrations.

In 2005, Ahmed Patel was inducted into the Rajya Sabha for his fourth term. Though considered Sonia Gandhi's chief strategist, he chose to keep out of the UPA government in the 14th and 15th Lok Sabha between 2004 and 2014.
Patel is only the second Muslim after Ehsan Jafri to be elected as a Lok Sabha MP in Gujarat.

He served as political secretary to Sonia Gandhi, the president of the Indian National Congress. He had served as the parliamentary secretary to the late prime minister Rajiv Gandhi in 1985. He had also been appointed as the treasurer of the All India Congress Committee in 2018, replacing senior party member Motilal Vora.

His last election to the Rajya Sabha in 2017, was heavily contested with the Gujarat state legislators being taken away to the southern state of Karnataka in order to prevent dissent, and select defectors being disqualified for revealing their ballots before casting them. This ended up being the first Rajya Sabha election from Gujarat to be contested in decades, while prior candidates had been elected unopposed.

Political legacy 
During the UPA Government regime between 2004 and 2014, Patel was one of the chief troubleshooters, coordinators and translators between the government and party.

In 2005, he had got Bharuch included as one of the first five districts to be covered under the then launched Rajiv Gandhi Grameen Vidyutikaran Yojana, to boost electrification in the district. The Sardar Patel bridge to de-congest traffic between the twin cities of Bharuch and Ankleshwar has also been one of his contributions to the region. The establishment of Sardar Patel Hospital & Heart Institute in Ankleshwar is also credited to his efforts

He was considered a part of the power center in the Congress party due to his proximity to the president, Sonia Gandhi.

Personal life
Patel was married to Memoona Ahmed Patel in 1976. The couple had a daughter and a son. He was known to keep a low profile and rarely interacted with the media.

Death 
He died on 25 November 2020, due to multiple organ failure stemming from COVID-19. He had been admitted to the Medanta Hospital and was in the ICU upon being diagnosed with COVID-19. His dead body was taken to his ancestral village in Gujarat, and was buried there.

References

|-

1949 births
2020 deaths
India MPs 1977–1979
India MPs 1980–1984
India MPs 1984–1989
Deaths from multiple organ failure
Deaths from the COVID-19 pandemic in India
Indian Muslims
Indian National Congress politicians
Lok Sabha members from Gujarat
People from Bharuch district
People from Gujarat
Rajya Sabha members from Gujarat